Tamara Podemski (born October 16, 1977) is a Canadian film and television actress and writer. She is known for her supporting role as Alison Trent in the television series Coroner, for which she won the Canadian Screen Award for Best Supporting Actress in a Drama Series at the 9th Canadian Screen Awards in 2021.

Early life
Podemski was raised in Toronto where she attended Claude Watson School for the Performing Arts.

Her father is an Israeli Jew from Kfar Saba, and her mother is an Anishinaabe from the Muscowpetung band of First Nations people in Saskatchewan. Her paternal grandparents were from Poland, and moved to Canada after World War II. Her sisters, Jennifer Podemski and Sarah Podemski are also actors. All three sisters appear together in the FX series Reservation Dogs.

Career
Podemski was a Canadian Screen Award nominee for Best Writing in a Factual Program or Series at the 8th Canadian Screen Awards in 2020, for her work on her sister's documentary series Future History.

She won a special jury award for dramatic performance at the 2006 Sundance Film Festival, and was an Independent Spirit Award nominee for Best Supporting Female at the 23rd Independent Spirit Awards in 2007, for her performance in the film Four Sheets to the Wind.

Filmography

Film

Television

References

https://indiancountrytoday.com/news/reservation-dogs-fetches-a-sister-act

External links

Living people
20th-century Canadian actresses
21st-century Canadian actresses
20th-century First Nations people
21st-century First Nations people
21st-century Canadian screenwriters
21st-century Canadian women writers
Canadian people of Polish-Jewish descent
Canadian film actresses
Canadian television actresses
Canadian television writers
First Nations actresses
Jewish Canadian actresses
Canadian Métis people
Actresses from Toronto
Saulteaux people
Best Supporting Actress in a Drama Series Canadian Screen Award winners
1977 births
Canadian women television writers